This is a list of the number-one hits of 1990 on Italian Hit Parade Singles Chart.

References

1990
One
1990 record charts